Brachmia amphisticta is a moth in the family Gelechiidae. It was described by Edward Meyrick in 1914. It is found in Mozambique.

The wingspan is 13–14 mm. The forewings are dark fuscous with the stigmata obscurely darker and the plical beneath the first discal, all edged posteriorly and the second discal also anteriorly with ochreous-whitish dots. The hindwings are dark grey.

References

Moths described in 1914
Brachmia
Taxa named by Edward Meyrick
Moths of Africa